Cape Maude is a high ice-covered cape forming the east end of Vaughan Promontory in the Holland Range, Antarctica, overlooking the Ross Ice Shelf. It was discovered by the British Antarctic Expedition (1907–09) and named for Colonel I.A. Maude, who donated the "Maudgee" pony ration for the expedition.

References

Headlands of the Ross Dependency
Shackleton Coast